Namibia competed at the 2004 Summer Paralympics in Athens, Greece. The team included one athlete, but won no medals.

Sports

Powerlifting

See also
Namibia at the Paralympics
Namibia at the 2004 Summer Olympics

References 

Nations at the 2004 Summer Paralympics
2004
Summer Paralympics